The 2000 Spanish general election was held on Sunday, 12 March 2000, to elect the 7th Cortes Generales of the Kingdom of Spain. All 350 seats in the Congress of Deputies were up for election, as well as 208 of 259 seats in the Senate.

The incumbent People's Party (PP) of Prime Minister José María Aznar secured an unpredicted absolute majority in the Congress of Deputies, obtaining 183 out of 350 seats and increasing its margin of victory with the opposition Spanish Socialist Workers' Party (PSOE) to 2.4 million votes. The PSOE did not profit from a pre-election agreement with United Left (IU) and lost 1.6 million votes and 16 seats, coupled to the 1.4 million votes and 13 seats lost by IU. Such an alliance was said to prompt tactical voting for the PP, which also benefited from economic growth, a moderate stance throughout the legislature and internal struggles within the opposition parties. For the first time since the Spanish transition to democracy, the PP results exceeded the combined totals for PSOE and IU. PSOE leader Joaquín Almunia announced his resignation immediately after results were known.

Regional and peripheral nationalist parties improved their results, except for Convergence and Union (CiU)—which had been in electoral decline for a decade—and Herri Batasuna/Euskal Herritarrok (EH), which urged to boycott the election and called for their supporters to abstain in the Basque Country and Navarre. The Basque Nationalist Party (PNV) benefitted from EH's absence and gained two seats, whereas both Canarian Coalition (CC) and the Galician Nationalist Bloc (BNG) had strong showings in their respective regions. Initiative for Catalonia (IC), which had split from IU in 1997, clinged on to parliamentary representation but suffered from the electoral competition with United and Alternative Left (EUiA), IU's newly-founded regional branch in Catalonia which failed to secure any seat. This would be the first and only general election in which both parties would contest each other.

This election featured some notable feats: this was the first absolute majority the PP obtained in a general election, with its best result in both popular vote share and seats up until then, a result only exceeded in 2011. In contrast, the PSOE got its worst election result in 21 years. This was also the second time a party received more than 10 million votes, the last time being in 1982, when 10.1 million voters voted for Felipe González's PSOE. The voters' turnout registered was one of the lowest in democratic Spain for Spanish election standards, with only 68.7% of the electorate casting a vote.

Overview

Electoral system
The Spanish Cortes Generales were envisaged as an imperfect bicameral system. The Congress of Deputies had greater legislative power than the Senate, having the ability to vote confidence in or withdraw it from a prime minister and to override Senate vetoes by an absolute majority of votes. Nonetheless, the Senate possessed a few exclusive (yet limited in number) functions—such as its role in constitutional amendment—which were not subject to the Congress' override. Voting for the Cortes Generales was on the basis of universal suffrage, which comprised all nationals over 18 years of age and in full enjoyment of their political rights.

For the Congress of Deputies, 348 seats were elected using the D'Hondt method and a closed list proportional representation, with an electoral threshold of three percent of valid votes—which included blank ballots—being applied in each constituency. Seats were allocated to constituencies, corresponding to the provinces of Spain, with each being allocated an initial minimum of two seats and the remaining 248 being distributed in proportion to their populations. Ceuta and Melilla were allocated the two remaining seats, which were elected using plurality voting. The use of the D'Hondt method might result in a higher effective threshold, depending on the district magnitude.

As a result of the aforementioned allocation, each Congress multi-member constituency was entitled the following seats:

For the Senate, 208 seats were elected using an open list partial block voting system, with electors voting for individual candidates instead of parties. In constituencies electing four seats, electors could vote for up to three candidates; in those with two or three seats, for up to two candidates; and for one candidate in single-member districts. Each of the 47 peninsular provinces was allocated four seats, whereas for insular provinces, such as the Balearic and Canary Islands, districts were the islands themselves, with the larger—Majorca, Gran Canaria and Tenerife—being allocated three seats each, and the smaller—Menorca, Ibiza–Formentera, Fuerteventura, La Gomera, El Hierro, Lanzarote and La Palma—one each. Ceuta and Melilla elected two seats each. Additionally, autonomous communities could appoint at least one senator each and were entitled to one additional senator per each million inhabitants.

Election date
The term of each chamber of the Cortes Generales—the Congress and the Senate—expired four years from the date of their previous election, unless they were dissolved earlier. The election decree was required to be issued no later than the twenty-fifth day prior to the date of expiry of the Cortes in the event that the prime minister did not make use of his prerogative of early dissolution. The decree was to be published on the following day in the Official State Gazette (BOE), with election day taking place on the fifty-fourth day from publication. The previous election was held on 3 March 1996, which meant that the legislature's term would expire on 3 March 2000. The election decree was required to be published in the BOE no later than 8 February 2000, with the election taking place on the fifty-fourth day from publication, setting the latest possible election date for the Cortes Generales on Sunday, 2 April 2000.

The prime minister had the prerogative to dissolve both chambers at any given time—either jointly or separately—and call a snap election, provided that no motion of no confidence was in process, no state of emergency was in force and that dissolution did not occur before one year had elapsed since the previous one. Additionally, both chambers were to be dissolved and a new election called if an investiture process failed to elect a prime minister within a two-month period from the first ballot. Barred this exception, there was no constitutional requirement for simultaneous elections for the Congress and the Senate. Still, as of  there has been no precedent of separate elections taking place under the 1978 Constitution.

It was suggested that Aznar would be tempted to call a snap election after the introduction of the euro was effective at 1 January 1999. Speculation arose among PP ranks and government members that an election would be called in the spring of 1999 or in June, to coincide with the scheduled local, regional and European Parliament elections. This possibility was fueled by some remarks from the Catalan president and Convergence and Union (CiU) leader Jordi Pujol, Aznar's main parliamentary ally, that a general election would be held in 1999—a comment that he later was forced to rectify— coinciding with a critical point in the PP–CiU relationship. In the summer of 1999, a new round of speculation emerged that Aznar was considering holding an early election throughout the autumn, but this was ended by Aznar re-assuring that it was his wish to exhaust the legislature and for the election to be held when due, in March 2000. On 23 December 1999, it was confirmed that the general election would be held on 12 March, together with the 2000 Andalusian regional election, with the Cortes Generales being dissolved on 17 January.

Background
On 5 May 1996, José María Aznar from the People's Party (PP) was able to form the first centre-right government in Spain since 1982 through confidence and supply agreements with Convergence and Union (CiU), the Basque Nationalist Party (PNV) and Canarian Coalition (CC). In the 34th congress of the Spanish Socialist Workers' Party (PSOE) held in June 1997, Felipe González, who had been prime minister from 1982 to 1996 and PSOE Secretary General since 1974, announced his intention to leave the party's leadership. The party, divided at the time between González's supporters—renovadores, Spanish for "renovators"—and those following the discipline of former deputy prime minister and PSOE vice secretary general Alfonso Guerra—guerristas—, elected Joaquín Almunia, a "renovator" and former Minister of Labour and Social Security (1982–1986) and Minister for Public Administrations (1986–1991), as new Secretary General. While it was suggested that González could remain as the party's candidate for prime minister in the next general election, he discarded himself out in January 1998.

A primary election to elect the prime ministerial candidate, held among PSOE members on 24 April 1998, saw Almunia, supported by González and prominent party "renovators", facing Josep Borrell, the former Minister of Public Works (1991–1996) who received the backing of the guerrista faction. Borrell defeated Almunia, but the latter remained as the party's Secretary General in order to prevent an extraordinary congress, a situation prompting a 'bicephaly' which would see both Borrell and Almunia clashing for months on party direction and strategy issues, as the extent of each one's competences on the party's political leadership remained unclear. Borrell renounced as candidate in May 1999 after it was unveiled that two of his former employees were involved in a judicial investigation for tax fraud, leaving a vacancy that resulted in Almunia being proclaimed as candidate without opposition.

United Left (IU) underwent a severe internal crisis throughout 1997 over Julio Anguita's confrontational attitude with the PSOE—to the point of siding with the PP in a number of votes in the Congress of Deputies—as well as with a perceived lack of democracy within IU. Anguita sought to prevent an electoral alliance between United Left–Galician Left (EU–EG) and the Socialists' Party of Galicia (PSdeG–PSOE) ahead of the 1997 Galician regional election, a move which received criticism from Initiative for Catalonia (IC), IU's sister party in Catalonia, with which disagreements over the coalition's political direction had been on the rise since the 1996 general election. The Democratic Party of the New Left (PDNI), constituted as an internal current within IU which had been critical of Anguita's leadership, was expelled from the alliance's governing bodies in June 1997, after party discipline in the Congress was broken on the issue of labour reform.  The IU crisis came to a peak in September 1997, which saw NI's expulsion from IU as a whole, the dissolution of the NI-controlled regional leaderships in Cantabria and Castilla–La Mancha and the break up of relations with EU–EG and IC. The PDNI then sought electoral alliances with the PSOE, which materialized ahead of the 1999 local, regional and European Parliament elections.

The PP government relied on confidence and supply support from CiU, PNV and CC. The PNV withdrew its support from the government in June 1999, with relations strained after the signing of the Estella Agreement between the PNV and HB in September 1998. The Aragonese Party (PAR), which had been allied with the PP since the 1996 election, broke away from the PP parliamentary group in October 1999 and joined the Mixed Group.

Parliamentary composition
The Cortes Generales were officially dissolved on 18 January 2000, after the publication of the dissolution decree in the Official State Gazette. The tables below show the composition of the parliamentary groups in both chambers at the time of dissolution.

Parties and candidates
The electoral law allowed for parties and federations registered in the interior ministry, coalitions and groupings of electors to present lists of candidates. Parties and federations intending to form a coalition ahead of an election were required to inform the relevant Electoral Commission within ten days of the election call, whereas groupings of electors needed to secure the signature of at least one percent of the electorate in the constituencies for which they sought election, disallowing electors from signing for more than one list of candidates.

Below is a list of the main parties and electoral alliances which contested the election:

The election was marked by the exploration of joint candidacies between the Spanish Socialist Workers' Party (PSOE) and other parties in the left of the political spectrum. One such example was in Catalonia, where a left-wing alliance came to fruition between the Socialists' Party of Catalonia (PSC), Republican Left of Catalonia (ERC) and Initiative for Catalonia–Greens (IC–V) under the Catalan Agreement of Progress label, aiming to mirror the success of a similar alliance between the PSC and IC–V in the 1999 Catalan regional election. Ahead of the Senate election in Ibiza and Formentera, PSOE, United Left of the Balearic Islands (EUIB), The Greens (LV), Nationalist and Ecologist Agreement (ENE) and ERC formed the Pact for Ibiza and Formentera.

Various attempts at forming a joint left-wing candidacy for the Senate in the Valencian Community were unsuccessful, primarily due to disagreement over the label and format of such an alliance. Nationwide, an agreement was reached between the national leaderships of PSOE and United Left, under which both parties agreed to cooperate in the Senate elections for 27 constituencies: in those districts, and taking consideration of the Senate electoral system allowing up to three votes to each voter, the PSOE would field two candidates to one from IU, with the parties urging voters to cast their votes as if it were a joint list of three. The PSOE also offered IU a similar agreement for the Congress of Deputies, wherein IU would not run in 34 constituencies where it would unlikely win a seat on its own, with a later offer reducing the number to 14. These offers were both rejected.

Basque Citizens (EH), the Basque electoral coalition including Herri Batasuna, called for election boycott and urged its supporters to abstain.

Campaign period

Party slogans

Opinion polls

Results

Congress of Deputies

Senate

Aftermath

Notes

References

General
2000 in Spain
2000
March 2000 events in Europe